Habura is a village and municipality in the Medzilaborce District in the Prešov Region of far north-eastern Slovakia.

History
In historical records the village was first mentioned in 1543.

Geography
The municipality lies at an altitude of 387 metres, and it covers an area of 27.82 km2. It has a population of about 470 people.

Genealogical resources

The records for genealogical research are available at the state archive "Statny Archiv in Presov, Slovakia"

 Greek Catholic church records (births/marriages/deaths): 1894-1896 (parish A)

Gallery

See also
 List of municipalities and towns in Slovakia

References

External links
 
 
http://www.statistics.sk/mosmis/eng/run.html 
Surnames of living people in Habura

Villages and municipalities in Medzilaborce District
Year of establishment missing